Stephanus Andries Johannes Swart (21 July 1888 – 6 May 1927) was a South African farmer and one of the first spree killers who killed at least 8 people and wounded 3 others in Charlestown, South Africa on 6 May 1927, before killing himself.

Timeline
Stephanus Swart was born on 21 July 1888 in Ladismith in Cape Colony. He arrived in Charlestown in 1920. Little is known about him before this time. It is thought he had been a Horse Trader.

Marriage
On 1 December 1921 Swart aged 33 married a wealthy 64-year-old widow, Anna Eksteen. She owned the farm Potters hill west of Charlestown which Swart farmed and made productive again.

Imprisonment
A few years later Swart seriously assaulted Willie Knight, the husband of his stepdaughter Fannie Knight. They lived on a nearby farm Shorstcliff. Swart served 18 months imprisonment for the assault with a horse stirrup.

Incest charges
After his time in prison Swart had been in a love affair with his 14-year-old niece Sarie Alberts and he brought her to come and live with him on his farm. His estranged wife Annie had left the farm to live with relatives in Potchefstroom and Charlestown.

On 1 May 1927 Swart was served with a summons on charges of incest.

On 3 May Swart fired shots at his neighbour Roets. He went looking for Willie Knight on whose assault charges he had served prison for, but Knight had fled.

On 4 May Swart summoned his lawyer Maasdorp from Volksrust to draw up a 28 page final Will and testament that was also a suicide statement. The police had asked the lawyer to convince his client to hand himself in, but Swart refused. He had declared he would not be captured and made threats of killing as many as he could and saving his last bullet for himself. His lawyer had notified the police of the violent mental state of his client and said his client was in a state of mental crisis. 

Swart failed to appear court in Newcastle on 5 may as an accused for incest. An arrest for contempt of court was issued.

Killing spree
On Friday 6 May 1927 a team of 10 policemen led by Captain Gerald Ashman arrived at daylight to arrest Swart at his farm Potters Hill. In the misty low visibility conditions Swart shot and killed 5 policemen including Ashman and wounded 1. Swart fled on horseback towards Charlestown. On the road he happened to come across his stepdaughter Fannie Knight and farm manager Cornelis Roets in a horse cart. He shot and killed them both on the road. They had both previously testified against him. From there he went to find his estranged wife in Charlestown where he found her in her brothers house, where he shot and killed her.

On the same day it is believed he also killed a black African man, but history has not recorded his identity.

From there he was heading in the direction of Volkrust and fired on a car wounding 2 people. At this point police all over the district had been notified and had formed a posse of local farmers along with police to hunt him down. The group caught up to him on the road between Charlestown and Volkrust and fired shots at him. Swart was spotted diving into a ditch where he shot and killed himself using the gun he had stolen from Ashman.

Swart was buried in the grounds of the Charlestown police station in a coffin that was too short for him.

Victims

Policemen
 Inspector Gerald C. Ashman
 Constable William H. Crossman
 Sergeant J.A. Grove
 Head Constable William Charles Mitchell
 Sergeant Annes van Wyk

Witnesses at previous trial
 Fannie Knight (step daughter)
 Cornelis Roets

Estranged wife
 Annie Swart

Uncertain
 It is possible there was an unidentified African man also part of the killing spree.

Memorial
A memorial was erected in the Charlestown cemetery for the 5 slain policemen.

Monument

A memorial on the location of the murder of Fanny Knight reads "Hierdie Gedenkteken is opgerigt ter gedagtenis aan Fannie Knight -nee Eksteen- en C. Roets, wat deur S. Swart geskiet was op die 6de Mei 1927, terwyl hy van die polisie ontsnap het to Potters Hill" (This memorial is erected in memory of Fanny Knight -nee Eksteen- and C. Roets. Who was shot by S. Swart on 6 May 1927 while he had escaped from the police at Potter's Hill).

References

External links
 Seven Slain as Farmer Runs , 7 May 1927. "Seven Slain as Farmer Runs Amuck.  CAPETOWN, South Africa May 6 -Seven were killed and two wounded in a shooting affray at Charlestown, on the frontier of Natal, when a farmer ran amuck in resisting arrest.  The farmer took refuge behind a stone fence after shooting and wounding a constable.  Police surrounded him, but he eluded them , entered a near-by village and shot indiscriminately, finally killing his wife and commiting suicide.", 
 Couzens, Tim: Battles of South Africa; David Philip Publishers, 2004. (pp. 207–15); 
 Marsh, Rob: Famous South African Crimes; Struik Timmins, 1991 (pp. 24–29); 

1880s births
1927 suicides
Mass murder in 1927
Afrikaner people
South African people of Dutch descent
South African spree killers
South African mass murderers
Suicides by firearm in South Africa
Date of birth unknown
1927 murders in South Africa
1927 deaths